The II Central American Games (Spanish: II Juegos Deportivos Centroamericanos) was a multi-sport event that took place between 25 November - 4 December 1977.

Participation
Athletes from 5 countries were reported to participate:

 Panamá

Sports
The competition featured 18 sports.

Aquatic sports
 Swimming
 Water polo
 Athletics
 Baseball
 Basketball
 Boxing
 Cycling
 Equestrian
 Fencing
 Football
 Gymnastics
 Judo
 Shooting
 Softball
 Table tennis
 Tennis
 Volleyball
 Weightlifting
 Wrestling

Medal table (incomplete)
The table below is taken from El Diario de Hoy, San Salvador, El Salvador, and from the archives of La Nación, San José, Costa Rica.  Medals from a shooting event are missing.

External links
An almost complete list of medal winners can be found on the MásGoles webpage
(click on "JUEGOS CENTROAMERICANOS" in the low right corner).

References 

Central American Games
Central American Games
International sports competitions hosted by El Salvador
Central American Games
Cent
Multi-sport events in El Salvador